The 2019 Coupe de la Ligue Final was the final of the 2018–19 Coupe de la Ligue, the 25th edition of France's football league cup competition, the Coupe de la Ligue, contested by the 44 teams that the Ligue de Football Professionnel (LFP) manages. The final took place on 30 March 2019 at the Stade Pierre-Mauroy in Villeneuve-d'Ascq and was contested by Strasbourg and Guingamp.

Strasbourg won the final 4–1 on penalties, following a 0–0 draw after extra time, for their fourth Coupe de la Ligue title.

Route to the final
Note: In all results below, the score of the finalist is given first (H: home; A: away).

Match

Details

References

External links
 
 

2019
Cup league
RC Strasbourg Alsace matches
En Avant Guingamp matches
Sport in Lille
March 2019 sports events in France
Association football penalty shoot-outs